Dog Leap Stairs, Kathryn Williams' debut album was released on her own label, CAW Records, on 10 May 1999 at the recording cost of £80. UNCUT magazine in the UK suggested the album drew favourable comparisons to the work of Nick Drake and Tim Buckley.

The name is a reference to Dog Leap Stairs, a well-known alleyway, with stairs, in central Newcastle upon Tyne.

Track listing 
All tracks composed by Kathryn Williams; except where indicated
 "Leazes Park"           (3:19)
 "Night Came" (music: Williams, Danilo Moscardini)             (3:53)
 "What Am I Doing Here?" (3:59)
 "No-One To Blame"       (3:31)
 "Something Like That"   (3:14)
 "Lydia" (music: Williams, Callum Train)                (2:45)
 "Handy"                 (2:31)
 "Dog Without Wings"     (2:27)
 "Fade"                  (3:35)
 "Madmen and Maniacs"    (2:59)

LP version 
The vinyl edition of the album contained an additional 7" vinyl single with two extra tracks not included on the CD
 "Kiss The Forehead"
 "Cradle"

Recording details  

 All lyrics by Kathryn Williams
 Vocals, Percussion & Guitar – Kathryn Williams
 Guitar – Callum Train, Howard Askew, Danilo Moscardini
 Bass – Gary Bowden & Callum Train
 Cello – Cath Campbell & Eleanor Rodgers
 Drums – Steve Chahley & Steve Thompson
 Piano & Synths – Callum Train
 Arranged By – Callum Train, Danilo Moscardini & Kathryn Williams 
 Artwork By – Kathryn Williams 
 Illustration – Kathryn Williams
 Mastered By – Tim Dennen

References 

1999 debut albums
Kathryn Williams albums